Alexis Musialek (born 4 July 1988) is a French tennis player.

Musialek has a career high ATP singles ranking of 255 achieved on 20 July 2015. He also has a career high ATP doubles ranking of 421 achieved on 3 August 2015.

Musialek will make his Grand Slam main draw debut at the 2018 French Open in the mixed doubles draw partnering Kristina Mladenovic.

Challenger and Futures/World Tennis Tour Finals

Singles: 22 (9–13)

External links

1988 births
Living people
Kentucky Wildcats men's tennis players
French male tennis players
Tennis players from Paris